Rubén Fernández-Gil (born 12 January 1978) is a Spanish former professional tennis player.

Fernández-Gil made his only ATP Tour main draw appearance at the 1997 Marbella Open and lost his first round match in three sets to Bernd Karbacher. On the ATP Challenger circuit, he was a doubles finalist at Segovia in 1998 and a singles quarter-finalist at Geneva in 2000. He had best world rankings of 505 in singles and 454 in doubles.

ATP Challenger finals

Doubles: 1 (0–1)

References

External links
 
 

1978 births
Living people
Spanish male tennis players